Garia puja is a festival of Tripura, India. It is held on the seventh day of the month of Boishakh. In 2019, Garia puja was on 21 April.

In Garia puja devotees sacrifice chicken for ritual purpose. It is a three-day festival to honour the deity Baba Garia is held annually on the first day of Bengali calendar month of Boishakh.

References

2

Festivals in Tripura
April observances
May observances
Hindu festivals